CocoSori (Hangul: 코코소리) was a South Korean duo formed by Mole Entertainment. They debuted on January 5, 2016, with the single "Dark Circle". On February 1, 2019, through a direct statement from Mole Entertainment, CocoSori was announced to have disbanded due to internal conflicts with member Coco.

Discography

Single albums

Singles

References

K-pop music groups
South Korean musical duos
South Korean dance music groups
Musical groups from Seoul
Musical groups established in 2016
2016 establishments in South Korea
South Korean pop music groups
Pop music duos
Female musical duos